The 1977–78 Guinness National Basketball League season was the sixth season of the National Basketball League.

The league was sponsored by Guinness and the number of teams participating remained at ten. The Loughborough team moved to Leicester, while Exeter and Stockport replaced the Avenue and Durham teams.

The Crystal Palace team completed a third consecutive double of National League and Cup. There were no playoffs for the League during this era and the previous system of awarding one point to losing teams in the league table was scrapped.

National League

First Division

Second Division

Guinness National Cup Final

See also
Basketball in England
British Basketball League
English Basketball League
List of English National Basketball League seasons

References

 
British
National Basketball League (England) seasons